Eat-More is a chocolate bar made by Hershey. It consists of dark toffee, peanuts and chocolate, and its slogan is "Dive into the unique taste of chewy dark toffee, peanut and chocolate." It was created in Canada by the Lowney company, which was acquired by Hershey Canada on July 1, 1987 from Nabisco Ltd. An early 1930s contest to name the chocolate bar was won by Angus B. MacDonald of New Waterford, Cape Breton Island, Nova Scotia; his prize was an art deco-style clock fashioned to look like a measuring tape.

It is chewy and comes in a yellow wrapper. It is also rectangular and flat, and "stretches" when you eat it.

A caramel version was also launched in 1995 which replaced the dark toffee of the original with caramel of similar consistency. It was the same size and shape as the original Eat-More, but it came in a copper-coloured wrapper. The caramel version has since been discontinued.

See also
 List of chocolate bar brands

References

External links 
Eat-More at Hershey Canada's website
 New Eat-More ad builds on successful strategy. Strategy.

Chocolate bars
Canadian confectionery